Johann Sebastian Bach composed the church cantata  (Christ our Lord came to the Jordan), 7, in Leipzig for the Feast of St. John the Baptist and led its first performance on 24 June 1724.

It is the third cantata Bach composed for his chorale cantata cycle, the second cantata cycle he started after being appointed Thomaskantor in 1723. The cantata is based on the seven stanzas of Martin Luther's hymn "", about baptism. The first and last stanza of the chorale were used for the outer movements of the cantata, while an unknown librettist paraphrased the inner stanzas of the hymn into the text for the five other movements. The first movement, a chorale fantasia, is followed by a succession of arias alternating with recitatives, leading to a four-part closing chorale.

The cantata is scored for three vocal soloists (alto, tenor and bass), a four-part choir, two oboes d'amore, two solo violins, strings and continuo.

History and words 
Bach composed  for St. John's Day, 24 June 1724, in Leipzig, as the third cantata of his second annual cycle, the chorale cantata cycle, which had begun about two weeks earlier on the first Sunday after Trinity. The cycle was devoted to Lutheran hymns, in the format of his chorale cantatas  rendered by retaining their text of the first and last stanza, while a contemporary poet reworded the inner stanzas.

Martin Luther's hymn "" (To Jordan came our Lord the Christ) is associated with the feast. Its topic, differing from that of the readings, is baptism, which is treated based on biblical accounts, starting from Christ's baptism by John the Baptist in the river Jordan. The hymn tune is "", Zahn No. 7246.

The final movement of the cantata is a four-part chorale setting of the seventh stanza, on the hymn tune. The five arias and recitatives between these choral movements are settings of text paraphrased from the hymn's other stanzas.

Music

Scoring and structure 
The cantata in seven movements is scored for three vocal soloists (alto (A), tenor (T) and bass (B)), a four-part choir (SATB), two oboes d'amore (Oa), two solo violins (Vs, the second one only introduced in a later performance), two violins (Vl), viola (Va) and basso continuo (Bc).

Movements 
The seven-movement cantata begins with a chorale fantasia and ends, after a sequence of alternating arias and recitatives, with a closing chorale as a four-part setting. Bach increased the number of accompanying instruments for the arias, from only continuo in the second movement, over two solo violins in the central movement of the cantata, to two oboes d'amore and strings in the sixth movement.

1 

In the opening chorus, "" (Christ our Lord came to the Jordan), the tenor has the melody as a cantus firmus, while the other voices sing free counterpoint. In the first cantata of the chorale cantata cycle, Bach had given the cantus firmus of the chorale tune to the soprano, and in the second, to the alto.

The opening chorus resembles an Italian violin concerto. The musicologist Julian Mincham likens the "solo violin's persistent, rocking, wave-like idea" to the waves of the Jordan River. Alfred Dürr compares the vocal sections, all with the solo violin, to the solo sections of a violin concerto, as opposed to the tutti sections with the orchestra. John Eliot Gardiner interprets the movement as a French overture, "replete with grandiloquent baroque gestures to suggest both the processional
entrance of Jesus and the powerful flooding of the River Jordan". Klaus Hofmann notes that the movement combines the old style of motet writing with the new type of solo concerto, and observes that "the main violin solo episodes ... are at first linked to the choral entries, but gradually assume larger proportions and greater independence as the movement progresses".

2 
The first aria, "" (Mark and hear, you humans), is accompanied by the continuo alone. Mincham observes that a characteristic fast motif of five notes, repeated abundantly in the cello, always flows downward, while Bach usually also inverses motifs, such as in his Inventions. Mincham concludes that it represents the "pouring of the baptismal waters".

3 
The following recitative is given to the tenor as an : "" (This God has clearly provided with words), narrating the biblical command to baptise.

4 
The central aria is sung by the tenor, accompanied by two violins, marked "solo" in a later performance, "" (The Father's voice can be heard). Gardiner notes that the music "describes, through its pair of soaring violins, the circling flight of the Holy Spirit as a dove". Hofmann notes the character of the movement as a gigue, and several appearances of the number 3 as a symbol of the Trinity: it is a trio for voice and two violins, "in triple time – and markedly so: not only is the time signature 3/4, but also the crotchets are each divided into triplets", and in a form of three solo sections as "all variants of a single model that is presented in the opening and concluding ritornellos". Hofmann concludes: "The sequence that this creates – three different forms of the same musical substance – is evidently to be understood as a symbol of the Holy Trinity."

5 
It is accompanied by the strings, similar to the words of Jesus in Bach's St Matthew Passion.

6 
The last aria is sung by the alto with rich accompaniment: "" (People, believe this grace now). The two oboes d'amore double the first violin when human beings are requested to accept the grace of God to not "perish in the pit of hell".

7 
The closing chorale is the final stanza of the hymn, with the instruments playing colla parte: "" (The eye sees only water), a summary of Luther's teaching about baptism.

Editions 
In 1851, about a century before the cantata got its BWV number, it was published as No. 7 in the first volume of the Bach-Gesellschaft-Ausgabe. In the New Bach Edition the cantata was included in Series I, Volume 29, Kantaten zum Johannisfest (Cantatas for St. John's Day). Calmus and Breitkopf & Härtel published performance scores. The Breitkopf score translates the cantata's title as Lord Christ of old to Jordan came.

Recordings 
A list of recordings is provided on the Bach Cantatas Website. Ensembles playing period instruments in historically informed performance are shown with green background.

References

Sources 
 
 Christ, unser Herr, zum Jordan kam BWV 7; BC A 177 / Chorale cantata (Birth of John the Baptist (24 June)) Bach Digital
 BWV 7 Christ unser Herr zum Jordan kam: English translation, University of Vermont
 BWV 7 Christ unser Herr zum Jordan kam: text, scoring, University of Alberta

External links
 Tim Smith: Bach fan thrills to discovery of lost 1724 pages Baltimore Sun, 31 August 2008
 Cantata BWV 7 Christ unser Herr zum Jordan Kam Oregon Bach Festival 2006
 Luke Dahn: BWV 7.7 bach-chorales.com

Church cantatas by Johann Sebastian Bach
1724 compositions
Chorale cantatas